Sivanthi Aditanar College, is a general degree college located in Pillayarpuram, Kanyakumari district, Tamil Nadu. It was established in the year 1984. The college is affiliated with Manonmaniam Sundaranar University. This college offers different courses in arts, commerce and science.

Departments

Science
Physics
Chemistry
Zoology
Mathematics
Computer Science
Computer Application (P.G)

Arts and Commerce
Tamil
English
Business Administration
Commerce

Accreditation
The college is  recognized by the University Grants Commission (UGC).

References

External links
http://www.sivanthi-ngl.org/

Educational institutions established in 1984
1984 establishments in Tamil Nadu
Colleges affiliated to Manonmaniam Sundaranar University
Universities and colleges in Kanyakumari district